CSS Grampus was a stern-wheel river steamer built in 1856 at McKeesport, Pennsylvania, for civilian employment. Taken by the Confederate Army in early 1862, she served as a scout boat and transport on the Mississippi River. Late in March 1862, Captain Marsh Miller in command, she took an active part in the defense of Island No. 10 where the Confederates finally sank her to prevent capture, on 7 April. The Union Gunboat Flotilla set out to raise her during May 1862 and did so, but she is believed to be the Grampus No. 2 which burned the following 11 January.

References

External links
 Naval Historical Center Online Library of Selected Images: CSS Grampus

Paddle steamers
Merchant ships of the United States
Ships of the Confederate States Navy
Shipwrecks of the Mississippi River
Shipwrecks of the American Civil War
1856 ships
Ships built in Pennsylvania
1862 in the United States
Maritime incidents in April 1862
Scuttled vessels
Steamboats of the Mississippi River